Thomas Devaux, born in 1980 in Marcq-en-Barœul (North), is an artistic photographer from France. He lives and works in Paris.

In 2011, he won the Bourse du Talent #46 (2011)  competition, which was organized by Photographie.com, Nikon, Picto, Herez and Bibliothèque Nationale de France. That same year he was nominated for the “Prix Arte/Cutlog Art contemporain”.

Biography 

Devaux became interested in photography at a young age. He experimented simultaneously with several artistic expression mediums such as photography, experimental filmmaking and painting and collages while studying film. His current work lies somewhere between photography and paintings, which allows him to pursue his research on sacred themes, profanity and isolation.

In January 2012 filmmaker David Lynch exhibited his photos during the inauguration of his new Paris nightclub, Silencio. For Le Figaro,  "his portraits of women taken at fashion shows and art openings, which are then digitally reworked, have a timeless grace that denounces with elegance the ephemeral character of beauty. ... Madonnas damned for all eternity."

At the end of 2012 some of his photographs were included in several collections including those at the Bibliothèque nationale de France (BNF)

His work was then exhibited in numerous countries like South Korea, China, France, Belgium, Russia and Hong Kong at the beginning of 2013.

He was invited to present his work during the prestigious antiquity theatre soirées held during the last Rencontres Internationales de la Photographie d'Arles 2013.

Artistic process 

In the words of Anne Biroleau-Lemagny, General Curator for 21st Century Contemporary Art Bibliothèque nationale de France (BNF), "Thomas Devaux is the author of several ambitious and complex series in which so many fundamental values like evolution in photography come into play. The photography’s index value cannot be denied. It is indeed a direct shot but a shooting immediately considered as a fragment of a future reconstruction."
One of his ways of working involves taking simple photos of models at fashion shows in Paris, and Milan or even of regular visitors at the openings of contemporary art expositions like at the FIAC or at the Paris Photos. He uses them as raw materials by transforming them thanks to digital editing software and making them barely recognizable.

According to French newspaper  L'Express, he uses fashion and the art world to “recompose a universe filled with symbols”.

For Yann Datessen, a photography & crafts professor at the Sorbonne, Devaux's characters are “ether beauties, flannel monstrosities, latescent Valkyries, patched-up ghosts that we sanctify and profane at the same time(...) Likes burned, worn-out, gone up in smoke, these new magnetic and electrified bodies have the boreal appearance of worrisome divinities. Hydras with furry tongues, spectral face, torsos with seven hands, female Cerberus, the bestial that Thomas evokes is filled with Dante-esque and Tararian metamorphoses...

His work plays on the textures and articulates on the body’s erasing and reconstruction. This is a style that is his very own. It exists between the sacred and the profane.

Works 
 TOTEMS (2019)
 RAYONS (2016-2019)
 THE SHOPPERS (2014-2017)
 RELIQUARIES (2016)
 ATTRITION II (2011-2017)
 [http://www.thomasdevaux.com/attrition1] (2009-2017)
 TEARING (2005-2012)

Exhibitions

SOLO SHOW Art 021 Shanghai 2023, China
GROUP SHOW, Art Taipei, 2023, Taiwan
SOLO SHOW PhotoFair, from 20 till 23 April, Shanghai, China
GROUP SHOW, Art Paris  2023, (Galerie Cedric Bacqueville Lille, Pays-Bas)
GROUP SHOW, Art Rotterdam  2023, (Galerie Cedric Bacqueville Lille, Pays-Bas)
GROUP SHOW, BRAFA  2023, (La Patinoire Royale, Belgium), from January 29 to  February 5
GROUP SHOW, Art 021, from 10 till 13 November 2022, Shanghai, China
SOLO SHOW, Art Taipei, from 21 till 24 October 2022, Taipei, Taiwan
SOLO SHOW, Louis Vuitton St- Germain-des-prés, Paris, Parcours St Germain + Photo days, off Paris + by Art Basel  2022  from 17  till 31  October, France (Galerie Cedric Bacqueville Lille, Pays-Bas)
GROUP SHOW,ART  PARIS  2022  from 7  till 10  April,  Grand Palais Ephémère Paris, France (Galerie Cedric Bacqueville Lille, Pays-Bas)
SOLO SHOW PhotoFair, September 2022, Shanghai, China
SOLO SHOW, May 2022, Seoul, Korea
SOLO SHOW PhotoFair, from 3 till 6 November, Shanghai, China
GROUP SHOW,  Paradis Artificiels, from November till December  2021, Galerie Bacqueville
GROUP SHOW,  "Divines", December 2021, Macadam Gallery, Bruxelles.
GROUP SHOW,  Galerie Bertrand Grimont , from  October till November 2021, Paris.
GROUP SHOW, September 2021, Taipei, Taiwan
GROUP SHOW, Nuit Blanche Mayenne, October 2021 (Le Kiosque, Centre D'art Contemporain)
UNSEEN  2021  from 17 till 19 September,  Amsterdam, France (Galerie Cedric Bacqueville Lille, Pays-Bas)
PARIS DESIGN WEEK, from 9 till 18th September 2021, Galerie Bertrand Grimont , Paris.
ART  PARIS  2021  from 9  till 12  September,  Grand Palais Ephémère Paris, France (Galerie Cedric Bacqueville Lille, Pays-Bas J8)
APPROCHE, May 2021, Galerie Bertrand Grimont , Paris.
DUO SHOW, from 28 April till  May 2021, Macadam Gallery, Brussels.
SOLO SHOW, from 10 till 31 October 2020, Centre Photographique de Clermont Ferrand, France, Biennale de la Photo Nicephore. 
"Faux Semblants" Galerie Bacqueville, du 1 octobre au 14 novembre 2020, Lille
ART PARIS, (Grand Palais, Paris)  from 28th till  31 May 2020, Galerie Cedric Bacqueville, France.
 GROUP SHOW, PARIS PHOTO, (Grand Palais, Paris)  from 7 to 10 November 2019, Galerie Bertrand Grimont, France.
 SOLO SHOW, July & August 2019, Musée Charles Péguy, Orléans, France.
 GROUP SHOW, "Immaterialité" Espace Topographie de l'Art, Paris, from 7 September to 9 November  2019, Galerie Bertrand Grimont
 SOLO SHOW, from 14 June till 30 June 2019, Macadam Gallery, Brussels.
 GROUP SHOW, PHOTO LONDON  2019  from 16 to 19 May, Galerie Cédric Bacqueville, Somerset House, London.
 SOLO SHOW, from 31 January to 10 March 2019, Galerie Cédric Bacqueville, Lille, France.
 GROUP SHOW, PARIS PHOTO, (Grand Palais, Paris)  from 8 to 11 November 2018, Galerie Bertrand Grimont, France.
 SOLO SHOW, from 10 May to 16 June 2018, Galerie Bertrand Grimont, Paris France.
 GROUP SHOW, from November to December 2018 "Biennale de l'Image Tangible" (Paris)
 GROUP SHOW, ("YIA" Paris), from 18th to 21 October 2018, Galerie Cédric Bacqueville, France.
 ART PARIS, (Grand Palais, Paris)  from 5 to 8 April 2018, Galerie Cedric Bacqueville, France.
 GROUP SHOW, from December 2017 to February 2018, Macadam Gallery, Brussels Belgium.
 GROUP SHOW, ("YIA" Paris), from 19 to 22 October 2017, Galerie Cédric Bacqueville, France.
 GROUP SHOW, from June to September 2017, Macadam Gallery, Brussels Belgium.
 CONFERENCE Skema Lille, September 2017 France.
 SOLO SHOW, from 23 February to April 2017, Galerie Bacqueville, Lille France.
"Divine Décadence", from April to July 2016, Museum Van GAASBEEK, Belgium (with Jan Fabre, Joel Peter Witkin, De Bruyckere Berlinde, Gustave Moreau, Kees Von Dongen, Erwin Olaf...)
 Conference "Les Grandes Conférences" November 2015: Salon de la Photographie Paris, France
 PARIS Maison Europeenne de la Photographie (MEP): Doc "Work In Progress: Thomas Devaux" 26 mn (Cinq 26) (Projection: 15 April 2015).
 ART PARIS, from 26 to 29 March 2015, Galerie Riviere Faiveley.
 PIASA ("Art is Hope"), from 3 to 7 December 2014, Paris, France.
 Biennial of Photography Liege (Musée des Beaux Arts Liège: BAL) from 15 March to 25 May 2014
 Conference (Attrition II) April 4, 2014: (Musée des Beaux-Arts d'Angoulême, France)
 The Off Brussels (Contemporary Art Fair, Off Art Brussels) from 25 to 28 April 2014
 Lille (Gallery Bacqueville: Group Show) from 13 September to 30 October 2013
 Rencontres Internationales de la Photographie 2013 (Arles, France: Theatre Antique): July 3, 2013
 Los Angeles "MOPLA" (Month of Photography Los Angeles): Pro'jekt L.A. (Projection: April 2013)
 Exhibition " Le Christ dans la Photographie Contemporaine" (Strasbourg), April 2013
 Lille Artfair (Contemporary Art Fair in Lille, France) from 7 March  to 10 March 2013
 Ulsan International Photography Festival (Korea) September 2012
 Slick (Contemporary Art Fair in Paris, Off FIAC) from 17 to 21 October 2012
 Salon de la Photo (Paris): November 2012
 Bibliothèque nationale de France (BNF),  Attrition 2012
 Lille Artfair (Contemporary Art Fair in Lille, France) 2012
 Cutlog (Contemporary Art Fair in Paris, Off FIAC) Paris, série Usures & Attrition 2011
 24H Project (Paris Photo) "Photo Off Fair"  (off de Paris Photo) 2011

Solo exhibitions
 Galerie Riviere Faiveley, from May to June 2016, Paris, France.
 Macadam Gallery, from March to April 2016, Brussels, Belgium.
 Fotofever (Off Paris Photo), Carrousel du Louvre from 12 to 15 November 2015 Macadam Gallery.
 Emoi Photographique Angoulême, France from 1 April to 5 May 2014
 Brussels from 13 March to 20 April 2014: Macadam Gallery
 Paris Fotofever (Off Paris Photo) from 15 to 17 November 2013
 Brussels Fotofever (Photo Fair in Belgium) from 4 to 6 October 2013
 Moscow (Photo fair): September 2013
 Hong Kong  (January 2013)
 Dali International Photography Exhibition (China): August 2012
 Silencio (Club David Lynch), (Paris), Attrition 2012
 Galerie Gabriel & Gabriel (Paris), Usures & Attrition 2011

 Awards and nominations 

 Winner of the Bourse du Talent #46 (2011)
 Nominated for the Prix Arte/Cutlog Art contemporain 2011
 Nominated for the Coup de Cœur Photo, L’Express Style 2011

 Bibliography 

 Attrition'' by Thomas Devaux

References

External links 
 

French photographers
1980 births
Living people